Joe Cameron Lewis (born 20 September 1999) is a Welsh professional footballer who plays for Stockport County, as a defender.

Career
Born in Neath, Lewis played for Swansea City and Torquay United, before signing for Stockport County in June 2022.

References

1999 births
Living people
Welsh footballers
Swansea City A.F.C. players
Torquay United F.C. players
Stockport County F.C. players
Association football defenders
National League (English football) players
English Football League players